Florent Marchet (born 21 June 1975) is a French singer-songwriter. His debut album, Gargilesse, was released in 2004.

Florent plays the piano, guitar, drums, and flute. He has collaborated with François Poggio, Pete Thomas, and Charlie Poggio. He has released four albums and an EP to date.

Discography

Albums

EPs

Singles
2011: "Des hauts, des bas" (with Gaëtan Roussel)

References

External links

 Official Site
 Fan Site

1975 births
French singer-songwriters
Living people
Musicians from Bourges
21st-century French singers